Siddiqa Begum was a literary personality of the city of Lahore. She has been the editor of Urdu magazine Adbe Latif
since 1984.

References

Pakistani writers
1925 births
2019 deaths